Saint Gabriel College is the pioneer school to offer nursing course in Kalibo, Aklan. Starting academic year 2013, the school now offers new courses. BS Radiologic technology and BS Medical Technology. The school has high school department as well and last 2014 it offers the BS Pharmacy program.

Departments
K To 12
College

References

Universities and colleges in Aklan